This is a list of football (soccer) clubs in Saint Vincent and the Grenadines.

 Avenues United FC
 Brownstown United F.C.
 Camdonia Chelsea SC
 Digicel Jebelle FC
 Fitz Hughes Predators
 Hope International FC
 JG & Sons Stingers FC
 K&R Strikers
 Pastures United FC
 Prospect United FC
 SV United FC
 System 3 FC
 Toni Store Jugglers FC
 Zodiac FC

Saint Vincent and the Grenadines
 
Football clubs

Football clubs